is a Japanese football player who currently plays for Omiya Ardija.

Career

One of the best Kansai prospects, from July to December 2013 he has been selected as J. League designated player by Omiya Ardija. Then in 2014 he entered in the regular squad of the Squirrels.

After the relegation suffered by the club of Saitama in 2014, the new manager Hiroki Shibuya gave him a lot more space on the field. He wears the number 39 because three plus nine makes twelve, which is usually the number associated with fans.

Career statistics
Updated to 10 December 2018.

Reserves performance

Last Updated: 10 March 2018

References

External links

#Twitter

1991 births
Living people
Association football people from Chiba Prefecture
Japanese footballers
Japanese expatriate footballers
J1 League players
J2 League players
J3 League players
Omiya Ardija players
Gamba Osaka players
Gamba Osaka U-23 players
Tokyo Verdy players
Yokohama F. Marinos players
Ventforet Kofu players
Pogoń Szczecin players
Association football midfielders
Universiade bronze medalists for Japan
Universiade medalists in football
Medalists at the 2013 Summer Universiade
Expatriate footballers in Poland
Japanese expatriate sportspeople in Poland
21st-century Japanese people